Patnitala (means Wife's Place) is an Upazila of Naogaon District in the Division of Rajshahi, Bangladesh.

Geography

It has 35570 units of households and total area 382.39 km2. The major rivers are the Atrai and the Shiba.

Patnitala Upazila is bounded by Dhamoirhat Upazila and Tapan CD Block of Dakshin Dinajpur district, West Bengal, India, on the north, Badalgachhi on the east, Mohadevpur Upazila on the south and Porsha and Sapahar Upazilas on the west.

Demographics
According to 2011 Bangladesh census, Patnitala had a population of 231, 900. Males constituted 50.33% of the population and females 49.67%. Muslims formed 78.56% of the population, Hindus 15.45%, Christians 1.80% and others 3.93%. Patnitala had a literacy rate of 52.55% for the population 7 years and above.

As of the 1991 Bangladesh census, Patnitala had a population of 1 98 164. Males constituted 51.26% of the population and females 48.74%. This upazila's eighteen up population was 98279. Patnitala had an average literacy rate of 32.9% (7+ years), and the national average of 32.4% literate.

Points of interest
Dibar Dighi is a large historic pond with a stone pillar, Kaivarta Stambha, in its middle. Both date from the late eleventh century.

 Gahon Pirbabar Mazar, Patnitala
 Kancon, Hazarat Zahor Uddin Cistia Babar Mazar, Patnitala
 Katabari Mazar, Patnitala
 Atrai River, Patnitala
 Nazipur Pouro Park, Nazipur
 Paikbanda Shalbon
 More than Forest (Shihara and Nirmoil)

Administration
Niamatpur Thana was formed in 1918 and it was turned into an upazila in 1983.

Patnitala Upazila is divided into Patnitala Municipality and 11 union parishads: Akbarpur, Amair, Dibar, Goshnagar, Krishanapur, Matindhar, Nazipur, Nirmail, Patichara, Patnitala, and Shihara. The union parishads are subdivided into 297 mauzas and 297 villages.

M P: Alhaz Shahidujjaman Sarker Bablu.
Upazila Chairman: Md. Abdul Gaffar.
Mayor of Nazipur Municipality: Rezaul Karim Babu (Balu Babu)

Education
High Schools
 Akbarpur High School
 Amair High School
 Amanta M.L High School
 Bamoil High School
 Bankrail M.L High School
 Barail High School
 Battali B.L. High School
 Bongram High School
 Chak Sreepur A. M. High School
 Chalkmuli High School
 Chalknirkhin High School
 Gaganpur High School
 Gahon High School
 Ghoshnagar High School
 K. M. H. Junior High School
 Kantabari High School
 Kharail High School
 Khirshin S. K. High School
 Kundon B.L. High School
 Madhail B.L. High School
 Mallickpur High School
 Mandain A. H. M. Cum High School
 Nagargola High School
 Nakucha High School	
 Nathurhat Fulbag Girls High School
 Nazipur Girls High School
 Nazipur High School	
 Patnitala High School
 Patul High School
 Puia Adarsha High School
 Shashail Girls High School
 Shibpur BL High School
 Shihara High School
 Shimulia High School	
 Takipur High School
 Usti BS High School	
 Uttar Rampur High School

Junior Schools
 Kanta Kismot Junior School
 Matindar Junior School
 Moheshpur Junior High School
 Paikbanda Junior High School
 Polipara Junior School
 Subrajpur High School

Colleges

 Nazipur Government College
 Gias Uddin Memorial MSTR (BM) College
 Gaganpur (BM) College
 Paddapukur (BM) College
 Matandor (BM) College
 Churhat Shibpur Barendra College
 Krishnapur College
 Nazipur Mohila College

Computer Training Center 
 Mannan Sarker Computer Training Center, Nazipur Bastend.

Dakhil Madrasahs
 Babnabaj Madinatul Ulum Dakhil Madrasah
 Badtilna Islamia Dakhil Madrasah
 Bara Bidirpur Dakhil Madrasah
 Boali Wari Islamia Dakhil Madrasah
 Chak Farid Meherul Dakhil Madrasah
 Chak Mumin Islamia Dakhil Madrasah
 Chalknodbati S. D. Madrasah
 Chandail Islamia Mohila Dakhil Madrasah
 Chhoto Moharandi K. D. Madrasah
 Dashnagar Molongshah Dakhil Madrasah
 Dibor Siddique Nagar Dakhil Madrasah
 Faridpur Nasaria Dakhil Madrasah
 Fotepur Dakhil Madrasah
 Ghoshnagar Jangipir Saheb Dakhil Madrasah
 Gobindabati Islamia Dakhil Madrasah
 Halakandor Sabed Ali Q. Dakhil Madrasah 
 Haripur Islamia Dakhil Madrasah
 Hatshowly (K. Para) Islamia Dakhil Madrasah
 Kadial Siddikia Dakhil Madrasah
 Nandash Baskail K. I. D. Madrasah
 Nirmail Darazia Dakhil Madrasah
 Paharkata Mapta Hussunna Dakhil Madrasah
 Rashkanai Islamia Dakhil Madrasah
 Shankarpur Islamia Dakhil Madrasah
 Shitol Shahjahania Dakhil Madrasah
 Shontoshpara Siddique Dakhil Madrasah
 Surhatti Shah Makdum Islamia Dakhil Madrasah

Alim Madrasahs
 Bamail Islamia Senior Madrasah
 Modhoil Islamia Alim Madrasah

Fazil Madrasahs
 Gaganpur Wazedia Fazil Madrasah
 Karamzai Senior Madrasah
 Khalna Islamia Fazil Madrasah
 Nazipur Siddiquia Fazil Madrasah
 Patiamlai Senior Madrasah
 Rahimapur Fazil Madrasah
 Usti Zakeria Senior Madrasah

See also
Districts of Bangladesh
Upazilas of Bangladesh
Divisions of Bangladesh
Patnitala Press Club
Nazipur
Gaganpur
Amair Meser Bajar

References

Upazilas of Naogaon District